KSK Cheksil is a (Chernihiv Worsted and Cloth Mill, Chernihivvovna) is one of the largest enterprises in the textile industry in Ukraine, based in Chernihiv. The first stage of the plant was put into operation in 1963. The company is just beside Tekstylschyk stadium and the Chernihiv Ovruch railway.

In 2013, the company's net income amounted to UAH 99.86 million (the level of the previous year), net loss decreased by 45.3% to UAH 8.75 million.
“Cheksyl” was awarded a Woolmark international certificate from the International Wool Secretariat based in Dusseldorf for 14 articles of wool-worsted fabrics

In 2020 the company signed a contract to supply textiles to Lithuania for the supply of products to Lithuania for EUR 200,000.

Company Product
 Pure wool worsted fabrics
 wool/polyester fabrics
 Viscose/Polyester fabrics
 100%Polyester fabrics
 100% Modacrylic fabrics
 Pure wool woolen fabric
 Carded Wool blend fabrics

References

External links

Cheksil website

Manufacturing companies based in Chernihiv
Manufacturing companies established in 1963
1963 establishments in the Soviet Union
Business services companies established in 1963
1963 establishments in Ukraine
Companies based in Chernihiv
Buildings and structures in Chernihiv